Club Deportivo Universidad de Oviedo is the football club of the University of Oviedo, based in Oviedo, Asturias. It was founded in 1961 and it plays at Estadio Universitario San Gregorio, with a capacity of 2,000 seats.

Club background
Club Deportivo Universitario (1961–1970)
Club Atlético Universitario (1970–1987)
Asociación Deportiva Universidad de Oviedo (1987–2014)
Club Deportivo Universidad de Oviedo (2014–present)

Season to season

3 seasons in Segunda División B
23 seasons in Tercera División

Honours
Tercera División: 2005–06

Notable players
 Ian Mackay

References

Football clubs in Asturias
Sport in Oviedo
Association football clubs established in 1961
University and college association football clubs in Spain
University of Oviedo
1961 establishments in Spain